Crusader or Crusaders may refer to:

Military 
 Crusader, a participant in one of the Crusades
 Convair NB-36H Crusader, an experimental nuclear-powered bomber
 Crusader tank, a British cruiser tank of World War II
 Crusaders (guerrilla), a Croatian anti-communist guerrilla army
 F-8 Crusader, a U.S. Navy fighter jet
 XF8U-3 Crusader III, an experimental fighter intended to replace the F-8 
 , three British ships
 Operation Crusader, a British attack in North Africa in the Second World War
 VMFA-122 Crusaders, United States Marine Corps fixed wing Fighter-Attack Squadron 122
 XM2001 Crusader, an American self-propelled artillery project

Arts, entertainment, and media

Fictional characters
 Crusader (Dungeons & Dragons), a Dungeons & Dragons character class
 Crusader (Marvel Comics), two different fictional characters in Marvel Comics
 Crusader, an alias used by a character claiming to be Marvel Boy
 Caped Crusader, an epithet for Batman
 Crusader X, an alternate version of Captain Britain
 Crusaders (DC Comics), a name used by a team of DC Comics superheroes
 Crusaders (Marvel Comics), a name by a similar team from Marvel Comics
 Mighty Crusaders, an Archie comics superhero team, later licensed by DC Comics and relaunched as "The Crusaders" on the Imprint label
 JoJo's Bizarre Adventure: Stardust Crusaders, the third part of the JoJo's Bizarre Adventure anime

Films
 Crusader (film), a 2005 TV movie starring Bo Derek and Andrew McCarthy
 "Crusaders" (original title Krzyżacy means "Crusaders"), a Polish film released as Knights of the Teutonic Order
 The Crusader (1932 film), a 1932 film starring Evelyn Brent
 The Crusader (2007 film), a 2007 direct-to-DVD motion picture
 The Crusaders (1918 film), a 1918 Italian film
 The Crusaders (2001 film), a 2001 Italian television mini-series

Games 
 Crusader (game series), a 1995 action computer game series
 Crusader: Adventure Out of Time, a 1997 video game
 Stronghold: Crusader, a 2001 computer strategy game

Literature
 Crusader (Bloor novel), a 1999 novel by Edward Bloor
 Crusader (Sara Douglass novel), a 1999 fantasy novel by Sara Douglass
 The Crusaders, a 1948 bestseller by Stefan Heym
 The Crusaders. An Historical Romance, of the Twelfth Century, an 1820 novel by Louisa Stanhope

Music

Albums 
 Crusader (Chris de Burgh album), released in 1979
 Crusader (Saxon album), released in 1984
 The Crusader (album), the 2003 debut album by New Zealand rapper Scribe

Groups 
 The Crusaders (jazz fusion group), a jazz and R&B group popular in the 1970s
 The Crusaders (garage band), a 1960s garage band from Los Angeles who released first Gospel rock record
 The Crusaders, Neil Christian's backing group
 Boston Crusaders Drum and Bugle Corps, a Drum Corps International World Class drum corps
 Oregon Crusaders Drum and Bugle Corps, a DCI Open Class drum corps

Periodicals
Many newspapers have used The Crusader as a title, including:
 Crusader, a newspaper of the African Blood Brotherhood
 Crusader, a publication of College of the Holy Cross, Worcester, Massachusetts
 Crusader, a newspaper of The Knights Party
 The East St. Louis Crusader, a former newspaper in East St. Louise for African Americans
The New Orleans Crusader, also known as the Crusader and Weekly Crusader, a publication that carried entries from Rodolphe Desdunes

Other arts, entertainment, and media
 Crusader (TV series), a 1955–1956 adventure/drama television series starring Brian Keith
 Southern Knights, a comic series originally called the Crusaders in their first issue
 The Crusader (sculpture), a 1931 Lorado Taft sculpture in Chicago's Graceland Cemetery

Sports

Athletics teams
 Bishop Heelan Catholic High School Crusaders, Sioux City, IA
 Belmont Abbey College Crusaders, the athletic teams of Belmont Abbey College, Belmont, North Carolina
 Capital Crusaders, the athletic teams of Capital University, Columbus, Ohio
 Canisius Crusaders, the athletics teams of Canisius High School, Buffalo, NY
 Crusaders, the athletics teams of Chicago's Brother Rice High School
 Holy Cross Crusaders, the athletics teams of College of the Holy Cross
 North Greenville Crusaders, the athletic teams of North Greenville University, Tigerville, South Carolina
 Pensacola Catholic Crusaders, the sports teams of Pensacola Catholic High School
 Univ. of Dallas Crusaders, the sports teams of the University of Dallas

Cricket teams
 Kandy Crusaders, a Sri Lankan domestic T20 cricket team

Football teams
 Amsterdam Crusaders, an American football team from the Netherlands 
 Carlstad Crusaders, an American football team from Sweden
 Crusaders F.C., an association football team from Northern Ireland

Ice hockey teams
 Cleveland Crusaders, a World Hockey Association team from 1972 to 1976

Rugby teams
 Crusaders (rugby union), a rugby union team from New Zealand, formerly the Canterbury Crusaders
 Crusaders Rugby League, a defunct Welsh rugby league club, formerly the Celtic Crusaders
North Wales Crusaders, Phoenix club of the above
 London Broncos, an English rugby league club once known as London Crusaders
 Western Crusaders, a rugby union team from Fiji

Other uses in sports
 Crusader (horse) (1923–1940), a United States racehorse
 Lucas Oil Crusader, a monster truck currently racing in the Monster Jam professional monster truck racing series

Transportation

Civilian aircraft and ships
 Crusader (speedboat), the jet speedboat in which John Cobb died
 American Gyro AG-4 Crusader, an aircraft built by the Crusader Aircraft Corporation
 Cessna T303 Crusader, a civilian aircraft
 Short Crusader, a racing seaplane built by Short Brothers

Civilian ground vehicles
 Crusader (train), a streamlined train which operated between 1937 and 1981
 Crusader, a type of emergency ambulance in widespread use in the United Kingdom, originally developed by the St John Ambulance Brigade
 Crusader, a GWR 3031 Class locomotive that was built for and ran on the Great Western Railway between 1891 and 1915
 Royal Enfield Crusader Sports, a 248cc motorcycle of the 1960s

Other uses 
 The Crusaders (repeal of alcohol prohibition), a group that promoted repeal of national alcohol prohibition in the U.S.
 Urban Saints, a Christian youth charity based in the United Kingdom previously known as Crusaders

See also 

 
 
 Crusade (disambiguation)
 Mujahid (disambiguation)
 Mujahideen, participants in jihad ("crusade" or "struggle")